The White Witch is a fictional character who appears in the stories published by DC Comics. Created by E. Nelson Bridwell and Curt Swan, she is usually depicted as a member of the Legion of Super-Heroes in the 30th and 31st centuries. Her real name is Mysa Nal, although her name was given as Xola Aq in Silver Age Legion stories in Adventure Comics; the revelation that her name was actually Mysa Nal was a later retcon. She is the sister of fellow Legionnaire Dream Girl and daughter of former High Seer of Naltor Kiwa Nal. Like Dream Girl, she is a native of the planet Naltor, where nearly everyone has the power of precognition, but unlike most Naltorians, Mysa cannot foresee the future.

Fictional character biography
To compensate for her inability to see the future, Mysa trained in the mystic arts on the planet Zerox, known as the 'Sorcerer's World', under the tutelage of five instructors (each having their own specialty - Air, Earth, Fire, Light and Water) and became an accomplished sorceress instead. Mysa showed a remarkable aptitude for magic and easily excelled in her studies — much to the chagrin of the envious Mordru. Originally, she had red hair, but as she trained in magic, her hair and skin became chalk white and her eyes bright red. This change happened gradually after Dream Girl freed her from the "Hag" guise.

She first appeared in Adventure Comics #350 as the Hag, an apparently ancient magic user and an agent of the villainous Prince Evillo. When the Legion fought Evillo, two mysterious "new" members, "Sir Prize" and "Miss Terious" (actually Star Boy and Dream Girl) cast a spell that restored her to her true form. It was later revealed that this transformation had been worked by the villainous wizard Mordru.

She joined the Legion after helping them defeat Darkseid in the famous Legion story, the Great Darkness Saga. Mysa proved herself a valuable member, often coming to member's aid with a handy spell or two. One feature that set the White Witch apart from the typical comic book sorcerer was a specific limitation on her spell-casting ability; she could only memorize a few spells at a time. Unlike characters like Dr. Fate, Mysa required study before casting a spell.

The White Witch played a prominent part in the so-called "Magic Wars", which concluded Legion of Super-Heroes (vol. 3).

Some years later, after leaving the Legion, she married the presumedly-reformed Mordru and lived with him on the planet Tharn, which was, at that point, subdued and invaded by Mordru's magics. She was subjected to mystical imprisonment and manipulation during this period until the Legionnaires returned looking for her and their comrade Rond Vidar. Mysa was also a physical vessel for the disembodied soul of Amethyst, one of the Lords of Order who is currently active in the present day DC Universe. It was this incarnation of the Legion's near defeat that led Mysa to take up arms against her husband, and she later rejoined the group. Right before Zero Hour, she was de-aged by Glorith to a teenager and appeared happy with the change. She assumed the codename Jewel and went underground with her fellow Legionnaires.

Reboot version
In post-Zero Hour continuity, Mysa was no longer Dream Girl's sister from Naltor, but rather, the daughter of Mordru.

The only survivor of a group of sorcerers who imprisoned Mordru, she spent a century preparing for his return, including planting the seeds for Zoe Saugin's powers and manipulating much of the girl's life to make her an ally against Mordru's next rise. After Mordru rose again, Mysa (who resembled the pre-Zero Hour Hag at this point) was reverted to the age at which she first defeated him and helped the Legion imprison him once more.

Mysa settled on Sorcerer's World and fell in love with Dragonmage.

Threeboot version
In the "Threeboot" continuity, White Witch has appeared as a member of Mekt Ranzz's Wanderers. Her home planet is listed as "unknown".

Post-Infinite Crisis
In Superman and the Legion of Super-Heroes story arc, featuring a group of Legionnaires based on the original, pre-Crisis incarnation, Spider Girl traded Mysa to Mordru in return for not attacking Earth. At the conclusion of the story, Wildfire comments to Superman that Dawnstar has a lock on Mysa's location, while Chameleon Girl assures Superman that the Legion will find their remaining lost teammates.

In the Legion of Three Worlds limited series, the White Witch is imprisoned on Sorcerer's World by Mordru until she is freed by members of the Legion, including Blok. It is revealed at this point that Blok and Mysa are in a relationship. Their escape, however, is thwarted by Mordru, and then Superboy-Prime's Legion of Super-Villains. Mysa uses Dawnstar's tracking ability to open a portal directly to Legion headquarters. Fellow Legionnaire, Green Lantern Rond Vidar, forces his teammates through the portal to prevent the LSV from following. Back at Legion headquarters, Mysa attempts another portal to rescue Rond but is too late as he is killed by Superboy-Prime.

Brainiac 5 then enlists the White Witch to cast a seance spell on an old Justice League space-time crystal ball to bring the "Reboot" and "Threeboot" Legions to aid in their battle against Superboy-Prime.

In the midst of battle, "Reboot" Legionnaire Kinetix, who possesses magic-based powers, is killed by Superboy-Prime while Mordru absorbs her life-force and all of her magical powers. Because her home reality was destroyed during the events of Infinite Crisis, Kinetix also possessed all of that universe's magic energies, now passed on to Mordru. Mordru began using his vastly increased powers in the villains' favor and launches a brutal attack on Blok to draw out Mysa. She reluctantly attacks Mordru with one of his own dark spells that allows her to steal his life-force and magics in a bright blaze of light. Mysa re-emerges as the Black Witch with a black costume and hair, using her increased powers to defeat most of the villains single-handedly.

At the conclusion of the story, the Black Witch remains a member of the Legion. However, Blok senses great trouble with his love's transformation. His concern increases as she returns to Sorcerer's World and claims Mordru's throne, vowing a vigilance against evil.

Later, Blok again reaches the Sorcerers' World, only to find the Black Witch sitting on a throne in front of several spellcasters imprisoned in the stone behind her. Poking out of the wall are the faces of Alan Scott, the Green Lantern wizard Torquemada, Blue Devil, Zatanna, Raven and Kid Devil. Later, both she and Blok cement their relationship, hoping to use Mordru's dark powers for the good of the planet.

Powers and abilities
Mysa Nal was trained by the master magician, Mordru. She can cast a variety of magic spells, such as creating force fields, transmuting matter, absorbing energy, and generating dimensional portals, among other feats. The only drawback is her memory, plus an additional time-consuming preparation for them, which could take up from minutes to hours. As the White Witch, Mysa possesses expertise in occultism.

Equipment
As a member of the Legion of Super-Heroes, she is provided her own Legion Flight Ring. It allows her to fly in both the vacuum of space and other dangerous environments.

In other media
The White Witch appears in the Legion of Super-Heroes episode "Trials", voiced by Lauren Tom. This version is not part of the Legion, and through a hologram guides the banished wizard Zyx in his attempt to regain his magic through certain trials.

Reception
Jesse Murray of Syfy placed Mysa Nal as the 22nd greatest Legion of Super-Heroes member of all time, noting her relationship drama with a "big-baddie" of the superhero team Mordru and calling her moment of her absorbing his powers as the Black Witch as one of the defining moments for her. Eileen Gonzalez of Comic Book Resources placed her as one of the "best" Legion superheroes out both a best and worst character list. Eileen noted her pivotal roles in "The Great Darkness Saga" with her role of stopping Darkseid and once again the role of "Final Crisis" stopping Mordru as defining moments as well. Caleb Bailey of Comic Book Resources placed her and her powers as "powerful magic user who could probably give Zatanna a run for her top hat".

References

External links
 White Witch at Comic Vine

Comics characters introduced in 1966
DC Comics female superheroes
DC Comics witches
DC Comics characters who use magic 
Characters created by Curt Swan
Fictional characters with dimensional travel abilities
Fictional characters with energy-manipulation abilities 
Fictional characters with elemental transmutation abilities